Damian Dame is the only studio album by American contemporary R&B group Damian Dame, released May 14, 1991 via LaFace Records. The album did not chart on the Billboard 200, but it peaked at #21 on the Billboard R&B chart. Both members of Damian Dame died before a second album could be recorded.

Three singles were released from Damian Dame: "Exclusivity", "Right Down to It" and "Gotta Learn the Rhythm". "Exclusivity" was the most successful single from the album, peaking at #42 on the Billboard Hot 100 in 1991 and hitting #1 for 2 weeks on the Billboard R&B Charts in July 1991.

Critical reception

Track listing

Charts

Weekly charts

Year-end charts

References

External links
 
 

1991 debut albums
Contemporary R&B albums by American artists
LaFace Records albums